Burak Akçapar (born 1967) is a Turkish diplomat with the rank of Ambassador; columnist at Sunday Standard and the New Indian Express; Associate Professor of International Relations; and published author of three books. Currently, he is the Director General of Policy Planning at the Ministry of Foreign Affairs of Turkey. Born in Istanbul. Between July 2011-January 2017 he served as the Ambassador of Turkey to India, Nepal, and Maldives. 

Former posts included: Deputy Political Director General for South Asia at the Turkish Ministry of Foreign Affairsand Turkey's representative to the International Contact Group on Afghanistan and Pakistan. Other previous postings included: Twice the Head of Policy Planning Department at the Ministry of Foreign Affairs of Turkey, the Deputy Head of Mission of the Turkish Embassy in Washington, D.C., recipient in 2002 of NATO Secretary General's Award for Excellence for lasting contributions to the North Atlantic alliance.  

During his tenure at NATO, as Facilitator of the Southeast Europe Security Assistance Group, he led the efforts to promote regional cooperation among Balkan countries. Achievements included the Southeast Europe Common Assessment Paper on Regional Security Challenges and Opportunities (SEECAP) adopted by Ministers in Budapest on 29 May 2001. Other assignments included Deputy Chief of Mission in Doha, Qatar and Vice-Consul in Hamburg, Germany. Research interests include international law, law of the sea, international security and international affairs. 
 Taught courses on Political Risk Assessment at TOBB ETU and on problems in international security at METU in Ankara.
 His most recent book "People's Mission to the Ottoman Empire: Dr. Ansari and the Indian Medical Mission, 1912-13" is published by the Oxford University Press in 2014. He has launched the book in 2015 at Oxford University with a lecture published by the University as a podcast.
 Previously he published an extensive study of Turkey's foreign policy and national security culture in "Turkey's New European Era" (2007, Rowman and Littlefield). Previous book: "The International Law of Conventional Arms Control in Europe" (Nomos, 1996).
 Also co-authored "The Debate on Democratization in the Broader Middle East and North Africa" (2004, Tesev). Other publications include among others "PfP as an Agent of Continuity and Change in the Euro-Atlantic Region" (in Gustav Schmidt ed. A History of Nato, 2001, Palgrave) and "Turkey's EU Accession" (2006, Yale Journal of International Relations) as well as "The Mutual Existence of Nascent and Senescent World Orders" (2009, Portland State University).

Turkey's New European Era: Foreign Policy on the Road to EU Membership
His book Turkey's New European Era: Foreign Policy on the Road to EU Membership received praise:
"This is a thought-provoking study by a Turkish diplomat with well-marshaled arguments. Akçapar provides the best and most up-to-date study of the benefits that Turkey offers European Union countries for gaining full membership in the EU. . . . Well written and argued, this book makes clear the growing importance of Turkey as a political player on the global stage, especially in the Middle East. Highly recommended."—Choice

"Turkey's bid for membership in the European Union could be one of the most important geopolitical events of the next few decades, with profound consequences for Europe's identity, the security and politics of Eurasia and the Middle East, and the debate about democracy in Muslim countries. Burak Akçapar, as one of the sharpest and most astute members of a new generation of Turkish diplomats, has a unique ringside seat on this unfolding drama. His book is worth reading for anyone with an interest in Europe's future."—Mark Leonard, Centre for European Reform

"Burak Akcapar's Turkey's New European Era is must-reading for anyone interested in Turkey and Europe. Akcapar's is the fresh and powerful voice of a younger generation of strategic thinkers in a country whose importance is destined to grow in the years ahead. His views on Turkey's quest to join the European Union highlight how much is at stake and how much better we need to understand these critical issues."—Ronald D. Asmus, Director, Transatlantic Center of the German Marshall Fund of the United States.

"Why does Turkey insist on EU membership? And why should the EU be interested in making Turkey a member? Skeptics would say that Turkey and the EU should each go its own way. Akçapar, a foreign policy practitioner, asserts that this is neither easy or possible. Turkey, the European Union, and the United States are tied to each other in important ways, as this seasoned diplomat explains with aptitude and clarity. A must-read for anyone who is for or against Turkey's EU membership."—Soner Cagaptay, Washington Institute for Near East Policy.

Scholarship
Burak Akcapar received his Doctor of the Science of Law degree (magna cum laude) at Universitaet Hamburg under the guidance of Rittstieg, Bull and Mutz. He has written on a diversity of fields and academic disciplines including history, international law, European Union studies, disarmament and international security, IR theory as well as Turkish and Indian studies.

History
In his account of the Indian Medical Mission to the Ottoman Empire during the Balkan Wars of 1912-13, he explains that concerned Muslims around India mobilized to dispatch three medical teams to treat wounded Ottoman soldiers. Among them, the one organized by Mohammad Ali Jauhar and directed by Mukhtar Ahmad Ansari caught the limelight, thanks to the regular letters sent home by the director of the Mission and published in the weekly Comrade journal. In the body of scholarship on Ottoman pan-Islamism, as a manifestation of pan-Islamist political ideology and Muslim internationalist action and its influence on the 1919 Khilafat Movement in India, the 1912-13 Indian Medical Mission has not been analysed in detail. His book studies the letters by the director of the Mission and the political and ideational context of the period to provide the first full narrative history of the Medical Mission, detailing its simultaneously humanitarian and political purposes and activities in Turkey. The book concludes that the Indian Mission was as much a humanitarian initiative as it was an effort to heal the pride of the Muslim population in India. The book therefore presents their story, first ever in a book, reconstructing to the extent possible their thoughts, voice, and the era that shaped them. The book also presents a compelling case for the Ottoman Empire - something that has not been done too frequently, where he tries to correct a perceived historic wrong: the portrayal of Turks as despots in Western historiography.

International law
Overall, his early scholarship on jurisprudence emphasized the New Haven approach to international law founded by Myres McDougal and Harold Lasswell at Yale Law School. The New Haven approach rejects formalist assessments and has been associated with norm scepticism. It has exerted significant influence since World War II. The ICJ President Higgins is known to belong to the New Haven school.

In 1996, he published The International Law of Conventional Arms Control in Europe, which recognized that “international law is under increasing pressure to cope with the complexity and vicissitudes of international life. This strain has only exacerbated in• the aftermath of the Cold War, as demands for a new world order intensified calling in a new agenda of reform in international law. In a bid to maintain and indeed improve its character as an obligatory and objectified set of norms, principles and procedures governing all facets of the states of peace and war, international law responds to this challenge basically on two fronts First, there is the effort to create law more rapidly and effectively. Thus, new types of sources of obligation and methods for creating them make their debut, and take their place in the international legal order alongside the more traditional ones? Secondly, new subject-areas concerning international law make a showing in international relations, such as environmental law. This development conforms to the meaning of Article 13 of the UN Charter which requires the initiation of studies and recommendations encouraging the "progressive development of international law." A third path employ: regional cooperation schemes to build regional unified spaces "based on common political and legal principles, norms and values. This points out to a shift of emphasis from grandiose global codification efforts to more promising and less indolent regional arrangements.”

Against this background, he argued that "the bountiful miscellany of arms control agreements provide a vast resource, for monitoring all the above courses of development in international law. Indeed, as far as new forms of obligations are concerned, the Vienna Document on Confidence and Security Building Measures in Europe concluded in the framework of a process based on a citadel of non-legally binding written arrangements: the Helsinki Final Act, distinguishes as one of the most pertinent politically binding agreements existing. The traditional approach, in this context, is represented by the 1990 CFE Treaty. Regarding new subject-areas, admittedly, the subject matter of these agreements is certainly not original. Their creative components are to be sought rather in their contents, although the contents of international agreements do not form part of international law per se. Arms control in general provides an original perspective into national security policy emphasizing cooperation and multilateralism in place of unconditional competition. Flowing from this pivotal idea, arms control agreements treat their contents in a systematic and cumulative fashion, each breakthrough being maintained and institutionalized not only at the follow-up agreements, but also at other arms control arenas. Ultimately, they are part of the effort contributing to the progressive development of international laws at a subject which is not yet covered by the classical definitions of international law. In so doing, they are not only reflecting thinking de lege feranda, but producing legally and politically binding international written agreements that create expectations and obligations for compliance (de lege lata) in an area as fundamental as national and international security."

Akcapar argued that arms control processes constitute one of the methods by which States seek to attain and strengthen minimum international public order. And, as all treaty-law, contractual arms control employs obligations, principles, institutions and procedures binding on the parties in this pursuit. Law is not the anti-thesis of force, neither in internal nor in international law. As all law, the law of arms control attempts to institutionalize cooperation, set standards of peaceful conduct, erect mechanisms to verify compliance, and develop appropriate procedures and institutions to deal with disputes and non-compliance.

Therefore, there is a persisting need to put arms control agreements into proper perspective. The central jurisprudential theme of this study adopts this perspective and investigates the role of -and interactions with- the institutions and mechanisms of general international law in the negotiation, operation, verification and enforcement of arms control agreements. The general jurisprudential thesis of the study is that, being part of and subject to general international law, the law of arms control cannot provide a technical guarantee against the occurrence of wars. This is because the weakness of general international law itself is not due to technical reasons: International law is a function of the political community of nations, the defects of which are due to the embryonic character of the community in which it functions, not due to its technical shortcomings. International law after more than four centuries of systematized experience cannot claim to have found an effective and consistently reliable anti-dote against determined aggressors or violators ultimately outside that of self-help. Arms control negotiations and agreements mitigate the insecurity in which the States in world arena find themselves as a result of this ultimately individual responsibility to self-preservation. If armaments are about deterrence, arms control is about reassurance, he stated, before he went on to an exhaustive study of the Conventional Forces in Europe Treaty and the Vienna Document on Confidence and Security Building Measures in Europe.

Democratization in the Middle East
“The Debate on Democratization in the Broader Middle East”, which he co-authored with Mensur Akgun, Meliha Altunisik and Ayse Kadioglu, asserted that the suggestion that democracy can be created out of turmoil and chaos is fallacious. Democratization in the region should proceed ultimately with an eye to stability. This is not only a regional and global interest, but also a fundamental humanistic premise. The perceived contradiction between progress and stability is avoidable and can be overcome by sound and consistent policy and adherence to fundamental international norms by both the regional and extra-regional powers. Legitimacy and moral high ground must be preserved in order to remain a credible advocate for change. Democratization should be supported via benchmarking which can be defined through criteria that a country is expected to meet.

The authors believed that the Turkish experience in the process of adoption and harmonization to the Copenhagen political criteria of the European Union is a case that successfully portrays this method. The paper also argued that democracy is in fact about striking of a modus vivendi between the processes of institutionalization and participation. Participation prior to institutionalization does not necessarily lead to democracy. Institutionalization and participation should co-exist. The establishment of constitutional liberties is the sine qua non of liberal democracy. In cases where political participation via elections takes place prior to the establishment of such liberties, illiberal democracy would be the outcome. Such a view may be disillusioning for impatient demands from below for democratization. Nevertheless, it contains viable “transitional” suggestions for the region in achieving sustainable democracy. Yet, rather than emphasizing a dilemma and a necessity of establishing sequences between institutionalization and participation, one should focus on the coexistence of these two dimensions of the democratization processes. The parameters of this coexistence would differ from one society to another. Universal democratic minimums involve the achievement and securing of constitutional liberties via institutionalization, the functioning of free and competitive elections as well as the establishment of functioning channels between civil societal organizations and political parties. In order for such waves prompted by civil societal organizations to lead to a democratic disclosure, there has to be a functioning political realm. A functioning political realm refers to a strong parliament with effective political parties. What is significant in the Middle East is not necessarily the establishment of more civil society organizations but rather the strengthening of the channels of communication between civil society and the parliament. Consequently, democratization initiatives in the region should strengthen the parliament while lending credence to civil society.

Against this background, Akcapar and the co-authors maintained that the key to democratization in the region is to ensure that it is not imposed. It can nevertheless be “encouraged” from outside. Democratization needs of every country in the region are different. Therefore, the goal of a democratization project should not be imposed from above, but should opt for opening up the channels that would allow people to tailor the projects that are congenial in their particular contexts.

IR Theory and Global Systemic Change

In 2009, Portland State University published Dr. Akcapar’s paper on IR theory entitled "The Mutual Existence of Nascent and Senescent of World Order", which has set out a theoretical model to identify and chart change in international system. The model suggested 10 hypotheses which Dr. Akcapar believed would delineate and determine change in how the international society organized and interacted. Accordingly:
 Any international order reflects the global political and economic architecture which in turn is a codification permitted by a given period’s circumstances. 
 As such, a world order is not a novel creation but an arrangement that is naturally selected from among the already extant options. 
 The next order will be carrying the genes of its predecessor complete with several flaws that pass from generation to generation.
•	A world order is shaped by the enduring interests of the leading actors. 
•	Every ensuing order rectifies some of the flaws of the previous generation of orders.
•	Any world order is also composed of a number of concurrent economic, political, military; global and regional orders. 
•	The world orders to date were never truly universal. 
•	Yet, the trend is towards more and more expansive orders both in terms of geographical reach and in terms of the multiple layers of everyday life that the world order arrangements regulate.
•	That said the world order experience is relative to how close within or without one is located to the center of the order. 
•	And, last but not least, the rises and falls of world orders do not happen in a deterministic fashion. Decisions, cultures and personalities do matter.

See also
 List of Turkish diplomats

References

External links
 Information from the Embassy of Turkey to the United States
 Turkish Model and Democratization in the Middle East
 Turkey and the European Union
 Regional Security Challenges and Opportunities in the Balkans
 New York Times
 Boston Globe
 Washington Post
 

1967 births
Living people
Diplomats from Istanbul
Ambassadors of Turkey to India